Still I Rise is a collaboration album by 2Pac and the Outlawz. The album excludes some of the original line up of the Outlawz, including Hussein Fatal, who had left the group as he had refused to sign with Death Row. The album contains all previously unreleased, albeit remixed material. It was released on December 21, 1999, by Death Row Records and Interscope Records.

The album features production from 2Pac's close producers Tony Pizarro, Johnny "J" and QDIII, and appearances from Big Syke and Nate Dogg. The album features mostly tracks from Shakur while he was on Death Row.

The album debuted at number seven on the US Billboard 200 chart, selling 408,000 in the first week. The album was certified platinum by the Recording Industry Association of America (RIAA).

Singles
"Baby Don't Cry (Keep Ya' Head Up II)" which features female group H.E.A.T. was the only single from the album. The song "Letter to the President" is featured in the film Training Day (2001).

Commercial performance
Still I Rise debuted at number seven on the US Billboard 200 chart, selling 408,000 in the first week. On February 2, 2000, the album was certified platinum by the Recording Industry Association of America (RIAA) for sales of over one million copies. As of September 2011, the album has sold a total of 1,692,316 copies in the United States, according to Nielsen Soundscan.

On February 10, 2000, the album was certified gold by Music Canada (MC) for sales of over 50,000 units in Canada. On March 14, 2014, the album was certified gold by British Phonographic Industry (BPI) for 100,000 units sold in the United Kingdom.

Track listing

Leftovers
"Secretz of War" (Original Remake)
"Tattoo Tears" (Original Remake)
"U Can Be Touched" (Original Remake)

Samples
"As the World Turns"
"Sounds Like a Love Song" by Bobby Glenn
"Still I Rise"
"Tenderness" by Walter Beasley
"Teardrops and Closed Caskets"
"Love Ballad" by L.T.D.
"U Can Be Touched"
"Piano in the Dark" by Brenda Russell
"High Speed"
"Genius of Love" by Tom Tom Club

Charts

Weekly charts

Year-end charts

Singles

Certifications

References

1999 albums
Tupac Shakur albums
Outlawz albums
Albums published posthumously
Albums produced by Daz Dillinger
Albums produced by Johnny "J"
Death Row Records albums
Gangsta rap albums by American artists
Interscope Records albums
Interscope Geffen A&M Records albums